Defunct is an indie adventure video game developed by the Swedish indie video game development studio Freshly Squeezed from Visby. Defunct received several nominations at the 2014 Swedish Game Awards including Game of the Year, which it went on to win. The game was also nominated for Best Student Project at the 2014 Unity Awards.

In March 2015, it was announced that Freshly Squeezed had signed a publishing deal with the Dutch video game publisher SOEDESCO. The release date was originally expected to be in Q3, 2015, for PC. However, the release date was pushed back and released on Steam on January 29, 2016.

In December 2017, the game was released for PS4 and Xbox One. In January 2018 it was added to the Windows Store. These ports were done by Soedesco Studios, the in-house porting studio of SOEDESCO.

On September 13, 2018, a port for the Nintendo Switch was released. It is scheduled for release in Japan on May 14, 2020.

Gameplay
The game is set on a post-human Earth, where the player plays as an old, broken racing robot. Players are barely able to move by themselves and are therefore required to use the environment for propulsion by utilizing the "Gravitize" ability to increase their gravitational pull. By turning this ability on when going downhill, the player will go faster; turning it off when going uphill will result in less of a decrease in speed.

There are speed boosts throughout the levels, either in the shape of little orbs which give the player a short burst of speed or as bottles or pools of "Enerjuice" which fill up a blue meter and can be used whenever the player chooses.

The player also has the ability to "Magnetize" which allows the player to stick to surfaces when going upside down or vertically.

Reception
On Metacritic, the Nintendo Switch version of Defunct received a score of 57 out of 100, based on reviews from 5 critics, indicating "mixed or average reviews". PlayStation Country gave the game 4 out of 10 points.

Awards

References

External links
 Official website of Freshly Squeezed
 Official website of SOEDESCO 
 Official profile at nintendo.com
 Official website

Adventure games
Post-apocalyptic video games
2016 video games
Video games developed in Sweden
Windows games
Windows-only games
Xbox One games
Xbox Play Anywhere games
Video games about old age
Video games about robots
Single-player video games
PlayStation 4 games
Nintendo Switch games
Soedesco games